Doru Popescu (born 29 March 1949) is a Romanian former football forward.

Honours
Dinamo București
Divizia A: 1972–73

References

External links
Doru Popescu at Labtof.ro

1949 births
Living people
Romanian footballers
Association football forwards
Liga I players
FC Dinamo București players
CSM Reșița players
FC Argeș Pitești players
FC Rapid București players